South Korean singer and songwriter Kim Jong-hyun (most often credited as Jonghyun) has written 80 songs, including music for his solo career, his band, and for other artists. He began his musical career in 2008 as a member of the boy band Shinee and later formed the ballad group SM the Ballad. Jonghyun made his debut as a songwriter with Shinee's 2009 single "Juliette", which was featured on the extended play Romeo. He was inspired by the 1968 film Romeo and Juliet, stating that he deliberately chose "a story which everyone can identify with". He began making frequent contributions to Shinee's musical output thereafter. Most notably, in 2015, he penned the lyrics to "View", the lead single from Shinee's fourth studio album, Odd. The song peaked at number one on South Korea's Gaon Digital Chart and received nominations from the Mnet Asian Music Awards and the Golden Disc Awards. Jonghyun garnered acclaim for the lyrics, which were inspired by synesthesia.

In February 2014, Jonghyun started a songwriting corner titled "The Man Who Composes" on his MBC FM4U midnight radio show, Blue Night, where he wrote songs based on stories submitted by listeners. In 2015, he debuted as a solo artist with the release of the self-composed song "Déjà-Boo", accompanied by his first extended play, Base. Jonghyun was credited on every song on the EP, which reached number one on the Gaon Album Chart and Billboard World Albums and won an Album Bonsang at the Golden Disc Awards. Later that year, he released his first compilation album, Story Op.1, consisting entirely of songs he had previously written for his radio show. This was followed by his first studio album, She Is (2016), and second compilation album, Story Op.2 (2017). Jonghyun described the Story Op albums as showcasing a side that is "more ordinary and human", as opposed to his other work that presents an "idealized" version of himself. His final album, Poet  Artist (2018), was released posthumously following his suicide on December 18, 2017. His solo music is largely co-written with his composition team, WeFreaky.

In addition to his solo career and his work with Shinee, Jonghyun has written several songs for other artists. In 2013, Jonghyun wrote "A Gloomy Clock"; the song was gifted to his friend IU after she expressed interest in it. It was included on her album, Modern Times, with Jonghyun as a featured artist. Jonghyun wrote songs for bandmate Taemin and labelmates Exo, as well as artists such as Son Dam-bi and Lim Kim. He was invited by Epik High rapper Tablo to write a song for Lee Hi's 2016 album Seoulite. The resulting single, "Breathe", was inspired by Lee's difficulties with breathing due to panic disorder. 

Jonghyun became active as a songwriter at a time when it was uncommon for idols to do so. He has been lauded as one of the few idols to differentiate himself from the "mass-produced" nature of the K-pop industry, owing to his artistry and songwriting prowess.

Songs

Notes

References

External links

 
Kim Jong-hyun